Salivary gland diseases (SGDs) are multiple and varied in cause. There are three paired major salivary glands in humans – the parotid glands, the submandibular glands, and the sublingual glands. In addition there are about 800-1000 minor salivary glands in the mucosa of the mouth. The parotid gland is located in front of each ear, and secretes mostly serous saliva via the parotid duct (Stenson duct) into the mouth, usually opening roughly opposite the maxillary second molar. The submandibular gland is located medial to the angle of the mandible, and it drains its mixture of serous and mucous saliva via the submandibular duct (Wharton duct) into the mouth, usually opening in a punctum located in the floor of mouth. The sublingual gland is located below the tongue, on the floor of the mouth. It drains its mostly mucous saliva into the mouth via about 8-20 ducts which open along the plica sublingualis (a fold of tissue under the tongue).

The function of the salivary glands is to secrete saliva, which has a lubricating function, which protects the oral mucosa of the mouth during eating and speaking. Saliva also contains digestive enzymes (e.g. salivary amylase) and has antimicrobial action and acts as a buffer. Salivary gland dysfunction occurs when salivary rates are reduced and this can result in xerostomia (dry mouth).

Various examples of disorders affecting the salivary glands are listed below. Some are more common than others, and they are considered according to a surgical sieve, but this list is not exhaustive. Sialadenitis is inflammation of a salivary gland, usually caused by infections, although there are other less common causes of inflammation such as irradiation, allergic reactions or trauma.

Congenital

Congenital disorders of the salivary glands are rare, but may include:
 Aplasia 
 Atresia
 Ectopic salivary gland tissue
 Stafne defect - an uncommon condition which some consider to be an anatomic variant rather than a true disease. It is thought to be created by an ectopic portion of salivary gland tissue which causes the bone of the mandible to remodel around the tissue, creating an apparent cyst like radiolucent area on radiographs. Classically, this lesion is discovered as a chance finding, since it causes no symptoms. It appears below the inferior alveolar nerve canal in the posterior region of the mandible.

Acquired

Dysfunction
Salivary gland dysfunction affects the flow, amount, or quality of saliva produced. A reduced salivation is termed hyposalivation. Hyposalivation often results in a dry mouth condition called xerostomia, and this can cause tooth decay due to the loss of the protective properties of saliva. In addition, The results of a study  have  suggested  that  hyposalivation  could  lead  to  acute  respiratory  infection. There  are  two potential reasons for increasing the incidence rate of this infection. First, reduced saliva secretion may impair the oral and airway mucosal surface as a physical barrier, which consequently enhances the adhesion  and  colonization  of  viruses. Second,  this  reduction  may  also  impair  the  secretion  of antimicrobial proteins and peptides. Therefore, hyposalivation could be a potential risk factor for acute respiratory infection. However,  further investigations are crucial to prove this hypothesis.

Hypersalivation is the overproduction of saliva and has many causes.

Vascular
 Necrotizing sialometaplasia—a lesion that usually arises from a minor salivary gland on the palate. It is thought to be due to vascular infarction of the salivary gland lobules. It is often mistaken for oral cancer, but the lesion is not neoplastic.

Infective
Infections involving the salivary glands can be viral or bacterial (or rarely fungal).
 Mumps is the most common viral sialadenitis. It usually occurs in children, and there is preauricular pain (pain felt in front of the ear), swelling of the parotid, fever, chills, and headaches. 
 Bacterial sialadenitis is usually caused by ascending organisms from the oral cavity. Risk factors include reduced salivary flow rate.
 Human immunodeficiency virus-associated salivary gland disease (HIV-SGD).

Traumatic

 Oral mucocele — these are common, and are caused by rupture of a salivary gland duct and mucin spillage into the surrounding tissues. Usually, they are caused by trauma. Classically, a mucocele is bluish and fluctuant, and most commonly occurs on the lower lip.
 Ranula — the name used when a mucocele occurs in the floor of the mouth (underneath the tongue). Ranulas may grow to a larger size than mucoceles at other sites, and they are usually associated with the sublingual gland, although less commonly they may also arise from the submandibular gland or a minor salivary gland. Uncommonly, a ranula may descend into the neck rather than the mouth (plunging ranula). If small, the ranula may be left alone, but if larger and causing symptoms, excision of the sublingual gland may be indicated.
 Nicotinic stomatitis — the hard palate is whitened by hyperkeratosis caused by the heat from tobacco use or hot liquid consumption. This irritation also causes inflammation of the duct openings of the minor salivary glands of the palate, and they become dilated. This manifests as red patches or spots on a white background.

Autoimmune
 Sjögren's syndrome
 Graft-versus-host disease

Inflammatory
 Post-irradiation sialadenitis
 Sarcoidosis—there may be parotitis alone or uveoparotitis (inflammation of both the parotid and the uvea of the eyes), which occurs in Heerfordt's syndrome.
 Cheilitis glandularis—This is inflammation of the minor salivary glands, usually in the lower lip, eversion and swelling of the lip.
 Chronic sclerosing sialadenitis is a salivary gland manifestation of IgG4-related disease.

Neurological
 Frey's syndrome

Neoplastic
 Salivary gland neoplasm

Diverticulum
A salivary diverticulum (plural diverticuli) is a small pouch or out-pocketing of the duct system of a major salivary gland. Such diverticuli typically cause pooling of saliva and recurrent sialadenitis, especially parotitis. A diverticulum may also cause a sialolith to form.
The condition can be diagnosed by sialography. Affected individuals may "milk" the salivary gland to encourage flow of saliva through the duct.

Unknown
 Sialolithiasis - although several possibly coexisting factors have been suggested to be involved in the formation of salivary stones, including altered acidity of saliva, reduced salivary flow rate, abnormal calcium metabolism and abnormalities in the sphincter mechanism of the duct opening, the exact cause in many cases is unknown.
 Sialadenosis (sialosis) is an uncommon, non-inflammatory, non-neoplastic, recurrent swelling of the salivary glands. The cause is hypothesized to be abnormalities of neurosecretory control. It may be associated with alcoholism.

References

External links 

Main